Eliot Rypinski Davis (15 August 1871 – 5 January 1954) was a member of the New Zealand Legislative Council from 22 June 1934 to 21 June 1941 when his term ended; then from 8 September 1941 to 7 September 1948 and 8 September 1948 to 31 December 1950 when the Council was abolished. He was appointed by the United/Reform Coalition Government then the First Labour Government.

Biography
He was from Auckland, and was a businessman and racehorse owner. In 1935, he was awarded the King George V Silver Jubilee Medal, and 1953 he received the Queen Elizabeth II Coronation Medal.

Davis was born in Nelson, son of Moss Davis and brother of Sir Ernest Davis the brewer.

References 

1871 births
1954 deaths
Members of the New Zealand Legislative Council
New Zealand racehorse owners and breeders
Jewish New Zealand politicians
People educated at Auckland Grammar School